Luke Justin Roberts  (born 25 January 1977) is a sports director and former Australian racing cyclist specialising in both track cycling and road bicycle racing.

Born in Adelaide, South Australia, he resides both in Adelaide and in Cologne, Germany. Coming from a cycle racing family, he started competitive cycling at the age of 13, and turned professional in 2002. As a team and individual pursuit specialist, holding an Olympic gold medal and World record with the Australian Pursuit team at the 2004 Summer Olympics, he contributes particularly to the success of his team in time trial events.

In 2003 he was awarded the title of Australian Male Track Cyclist of the Year. In 2005 he was awarded the Order of Australia medal in the Australia Day Honours List. In 2002, 2003 and 2004 he was a World Champion Team pursuit, and won the silver medal in 2002 and 2003 for the World Individual Pursuit Championship.

At the Olympic level, Luke Roberts has competed as part of the Australian cycling team at the 2000 Summer Olympics in Sydney and the 2004 Summer Olympics in Athens. In 2000 he came 9th in the Individual Pursuit at the Olympic Games. He improved his performance 4 years later in Athens, coming 5th in the Individual Pursuit. As part of the Australian pursuit team with Graeme Brown, Brett Lancaster, Bradley McGee, (Peter Dawson and Stephen Wooldridge were also part of the team), Roberts won gold and set a new world record for the 4000m Team Pursuit of 3mins 56.610secs, breaking their previous world record set in Stuttgart in 2003.

At the 1998 Commonwealth Games, Roberts achieved a gold medal for the Teams Pursuit, a silver medal in the Individual Pursuit, and came 8th in the Points race. Four year later at the 2002 Commonwealth Games in Manchester, Roberts won gold in the Teams Pursuit and 4th in the Individual Pursuit. His 2010 road racing team, folded at the end of that season, and he signed to ride for a proposed Australian team known as Pegasus: this team, however, failed to obtain a UCI license.

Major results

1993
Under-17 National Track Championships
1st  Individual pursuit
1st  Sprint
Under-17 National Road Championships
1st  Individual time trial
1st  Team time trial
1994
 1st  Junior Teams Pursuit World Champion
1995
Junior World Track Championships
1st  Individual pursuit
1st  Team pursuit
Junior National Track Championships
1st  Individual pursuit
1st  Team pursuit
1st  Elimination race
1st  Points race
1st  Junior National Time Trial Championships
1996
 1st  National Teams Pursuit Champion
1998
 1st  Teams Pursuit 1998 Commonwealth Games
 1st  National Teams Pursuit Champion
 Track World Cup
1st Individual pursuit
1st Madison
1st Team pursuit
 2nd  Individual Pursuit 1998 Commonwealth Games
1999
National Track Championships
1st  Individual pursuit
1st  Team pursuit
 1st Teams Pursuit Track World Cup
 1st Individual Pursuit overall Track World Cup rankings
 2nd Individual Pursuit Track World Cup
2000
 1st  National Individual Pursuit Champion
2001
 1st Stage 4 Tour Down Under
2002
 1st  Teams Pursuit World Champion
 1st  Teams Pursuit 2002 Commonwealth Games
 1st Overall Tour of Tasmania
2003
 1st  Team Pursuit World Champion
 1st Individual Pursuit, UCI Track Cycling World Cup Classics
 Giro del Veneto
1st Prologue & Stage 4
 1st Giro del Capo
 1st Stage 5 Ringerike Grand Prix
 2nd  Individual Pursuit World Titles
 2nd Overall Brandenburg-Rundfahrt
 2nd Overall Herald Sun Tour
2004
 1st  2004 Summer Olympic Games Team Pursuit
 1st  Team Pursuit World Champion
 1st Stage 6 Tour de Normandie
 1st Stage 1 Intl Rheinland-Pfalz Rundfahrt
 9th Overall Tour Down Under
2005
 1st Stage 4 TTT Tour Méditerranéen
 3rd Eindhoven Team Time Trial
 6th TEAG Hainleite
 8th T-Mobile International
 10th LUK Challenge Chrono Bühl
2006
 1st Stage 4, 3-Länder-Tour
 3rd Overall Bayern-Rundfahrt
2007
 1st Eindhoven TTT
 3rd Overall Tour of Britain
 6th Overall Tour Down Under
 9th Paris–Bourges
2008
 1st Stage 3 Giro del Capo
 1st Stolberg-Breinig
2009
 1st Grenoble, Six Days
2010
 1st Stage 3 Tour of Murcia
 5th Overall Tour Down Under
2011
 10th Overall Tour Down Under
 1st  Mountains classification
2012
7th Overall Driedaagse van West-Vlaanderen
2013
1st Prologue Istrian Spring Trophy
5th Poreč Trophy

References

1977 births
Living people
Australian male cyclists
Cyclists at the 2008 Summer Olympics
Cyclists at the 2004 Summer Olympics
Cyclists at the 2000 Summer Olympics
Olympic cyclists of Australia
Olympic gold medalists for Australia
Cyclists at the 1998 Commonwealth Games
Cyclists at the 2002 Commonwealth Games
Cyclists from Adelaide
Australian Institute of Sport cyclists
Olympic medalists in cycling
UCI Track Cycling World Champions (men)
Cyclists from South Australia
Medalists at the 2004 Summer Olympics
Commonwealth Games medallists in cycling
Commonwealth Games gold medallists for Australia
Commonwealth Games silver medallists for Australia
Recipients of the Medal of the Order of Australia
Australian track cyclists
Medallists at the 1998 Commonwealth Games
Medallists at the 2002 Commonwealth Games